The Dimir River or Dimer River is a river in Madang Province, Papua New Guinea.

The Dimir language is spoken in the area.

See also
List of rivers of Papua New Guinea

References

Rivers of Papua New Guinea